Edward or Ed Kraus could refer to: 

Edward Henry Kraus (1875–1973), American academic and mineralogist
Ed Kraus, interim chief of the Fort Worth Police Department
Edward H. Kraus, mayor of Solon, Ohio

See also
Edward Krause (disambiguation)